"Papa Chico" is a song by Italian drummer Tony Esposito from his album As tu as (1985). Topping the charts in Austria, Belgium, the Netherlands and Italy, "Papa Chico" became his biggest hit after "Kalimba de Luna" (1984). Both songs were covered by Boney M.

Releases
7" Single
 "Papa Chico" - 4:01 / "As tu as" - 3:55 (Hansa 107 661–100, Germany)

Boney M. version

"Papa Chico" is a Boney M. single from 1994, recorded by original lead singer Liz Mitchell as one of four new tracks on the compilation album More Gold - 20 Super Hits Vol. II. The single, credited to Boney M. feat. Liz Mitchell, pictured the singer's line-up with Carol Grey, Patricia Foster and Curt Dee Daran on the cover, and also included the ballad "Time to Remember" from the same album. The single failed to chart anywhere.

C-Bra version 
The song was also covered by the group C-Bra in 1999.

Releases
CD
Boney M. feat Liz Mitchell: "Papa Chico" (BMG 74321 20364 2, 1994)  
 "Papa Chico" (Radio Version) - 3:52 
 "Time to Remember" (Farian, Kawohl, Bischof-Fallenstein) - 3:15 
 "Papa Chico" (Club Mix) - 4:22 
 "Papa Chico" (Rap Version) - 4:44

12" Single
"Papa Chico" (Club Mix) - 4:22 / (Radio Version) - 3:52 / (Rap Version) - 4:43 / "Time to Remember" (Edit Version) - 3:15

References

Sources
 http://swisscharts.com/showitem.asp?interpret=Tony+Esposito&titel=Papa+Chico&cat=s

1985 singles
Italian songs
Song recordings produced by Frank Farian
Songs written by Tony Esposito (musician)
1985 songs